Never or Now is the debut solo album by Welsh recording artist Lisa Scott-Lee. It was first released in South Africa on 26 March 2007, and on 14 June 2007 as a digital download in the United Kingdom by Concept Records. The album consists of Scott-Lee's first two singles "Lately" and "Too Far Gone" some other tracks that were released and through Mercury Records before she was dropped in 2003 as well as some later material she worked on while she was signed to Concept Records such as the single "Electric".

An expanded deluxe version is due for release in 2023, in celebration of twenty years since Scott-Lee's debut as a solo artist.

Background and development 

The album started production in 2003 when Scott-Lee collaborated with Point4 to release her first solo single, "Lately". The album was originally going to be released in late 2003 as Unleashed,. Promotional samplers were sent out that year, which included the songs "Lately", "Too Far Gone", "I'll Wait For You", "Sleazy", "Back In Time" and "Obscenely Delicious". Scott-lee spoke about the album's planned release in an interview, stating "My new album is called Unleashed [...] I've wrote about 40 tracks and I picked the best 12 to put on the album, so I feel like I've done a good job and I think it's a really good album". After the success of "Lately" Scott-Lee released her second solo single "Too Far Gone" which the Top 10 UK Singles Chart. Scott-Lee was subsequently dropped by Mercury Records.

While working on her MTV show Totally Scott-Lee in 2005, she signed a new recording contract with independent UK label Concept Records. "Electric" was chosen by the record company to release as a single as they thought it would have some public appeal. The song was written by Guy Chambers and former A1 singer Ben Adams. The single peaked at number 13 in the UK charts, the record label thought to keep Scott-Lee signed and decided to release the single in different places around the world as well as finishing up an album. The tracks from the Unleashed album promotional samplers were the only tracks from Mercury Records that were released to the public so they were added onto the final track listing of the record. In late 2005, Scott-Lee published a new song onto her website called "Boy on the Dance Floor" as a Christmas gift to her fans with the message "Merry Xmas from Lisa and all of the LSL team, we hope you love this free Xmas gift and have a great time singing and dancing along." This song was also added to the track listing of the eventual album release.\

Title and artwork
The album was originally titled Unleashed and a sampler containing six songs circulated in 2003. Scott-Lee was photographed by fashion photographers Sandrine Dulermo and Michael Labica during 2002 for the artwork of the album and single covers. Art direction was overseen by Root Studio, specifically Tom Bird and David Coffin. The artwork and images showcased a darker, more sultry image for Scott-Lee who had previously been a member of the wholesome pop group Steps. After being dropped by Mercury Records at the end of 2003, the album was renamed Never or Now. The original album cover art was used, with slight alterations to the font.

Composition and recording
The album starts with Scott-Lee's 2003 hit single, "Lately", the track is an uptempo dance-pop song with influences of funk, lyrically it talks about a woman's infatuation about someone else. The second track on the album is Scott-Lee's second single "Too Far Gone" which is more trance influenced, lyrically the song is about a kiss-off to a former flame and having moved on from a past relationship. The next track is "Electric" which was written by Ben Adams and Guy Chambers, the track has more a Rock-Pop feel to it with harder hitting beats with electric sirens running through it. Lyrically Scott-Lee refers to herself as a metaphor for being somewhat like electricity singing the lyrics "Duracell got nothing on me/you know you're turning me on/an now I'm ready to blow yeah/ baby I'm electric" comparing herself to the battery brand Duracell. "Back in Time" is a dance-pop song which talks about regret and wanting to revisit the past to fix mistakes, it has been rumored that Scott-Lee wrote the song as a reaction to how Steps broke up as she wrote it before the release of her cancelled album Unleashed.

"Obscenely Delicious", the next track is a house influenced track which is lyrically about wanting someone to see themselves from someone else's perspective so that they see how great they are. The next track "Boy On The Dance Floor" is a Latin-dance inspired track with fast-paced Guitar, the song talks about wishing that you would have plucked up the courage to make the first move with someone else that could have turned into a serious relationship in the future. "Give You My Love" is a mid-tempo dance-pop song which is lyrically similar to "Lately" in context. "Make It Last Forever" is a 90's inspired track with strong piano chords chiming through the beats that progresses into a more trance sound, it talks about living in the moment when you are with a lover the lyrics are a little more provocative than what has already been delivered in the album with the lyrics "so come with me/and I'll take you to/a secret place to hide/ I'll show you just what to do". "Sleazy" is the most provocative track on the album with underground synth sounds complemented with light beats, lyrically it talks about a character seducing a lover.

"I'll Wait For You" is the first ballad on the album with a low-tempo light beat and piano sounds and synths, the song talks about being upset over a past relationship, the chorus' melody is similar to Kym Marsh's single "Cry". "You're No Good for Me" is a more rock-pop track which has drawn influences from bands who broke out during the mid 2000s such as Keane and Kaiser Chiefs, the low-tempo song lyrically is about knowing that you should walk away from a toxic relationship but keep being drawn back into it. The song was originally recorded by Maria Willson for her shelved 2003 album Alibi. "Rush" continues the rock-pop sound into the album which is more uptempo song which, like "Give You My Love" is similar to "Lately" in terms of lyrical context. The album track "Never or Now" is the most rock influenced track on the album with electric guitar running through the track which talks about having to make a tough decision in a relationship.

Release 
In April 2006, it was announced that her first full-length solo album would be called Never or Now, the release date for the album was going to be 26 March 2007 presumably to capitalize her success from the Hit TV show Dancing On Ice. Scott-Lee was eliminated early on in the show resulting in her finishing in sixth place so the release date for the UK was pushed back to June. However the album was released in South Africa on the set date for the UK release. The title of the album came from the last track on the record, which Scott-Lee had tried to push make a single instead of "Electric" as it was one of her favourite tracks on the album. The album was finally released in South Africa on 26 March 2007, and on 14 June 2007 as a digital download in the United Kingdom by Concept Records.

Track listing

Notes
  signifies a remixer

Release history

References 

2007 debut albums
Lisa Scott-Lee albums
Concept Records albums